Wak Chan Kʼawiil, also known as Double Bird (January 508? – ), was an ajaw of the Maya city of Tikal. He took the throne on December 27, 537(?) and reigning probably until his death. He was son of Chak Tok Ichʼaak II and Lady Hand. He sponsored accession of Yajaw Teʼ Kʼinich II, ruler of Caracol in 553. The monument associated with Wak Chan Kʼawiil is Stelae 17.

Notes

Footnotes

References

Date of birth unknown
Date of death unknown
Rulers of Tikal
6th century in the Maya civilization
6th-century monarchs in North America
500s births
560s deaths